Héctor Puebla Saavedra (born 10 July 1955) is a Chilean footballer commonly known for playing in Cobreloa during sixteen years.

Career
Nicknamed "El Ligua" after his home town, he came to Cobreloa in 1980 from southern Chilean soccer team Lota Schwager, where he played as a striker, and slowly became a central defender he was while playing for Cobreloa.

Puebla played many games for the national squad. In a game against Argentina in the Copa America of 1989, he annulled the world's top Diego Maradona. Diego later gave Puebla his jersey. He played 34 matches for Chile, scoring 1 goal between 1984 and 1990, making his debut on 1984-06-17 in a game against England.

Honours

Club
Cobreloa
 Primera División de Chile (1): 1980, 1982, 1985, 1988, 1992
 Copa Libertadores Runner-up (2): 1981, 1982

References

External links

1955 births
People from Petorca Province
Lota Schwager footballers
Cobreloa footballers
Chilean footballers
Chile international footballers
1987 Copa América players
1989 Copa América players
Living people
Association football forwards